Vietnam Olympic Committee (IOC code: VIE) is the National Olympic Committee representing Vietnam.

References

External links 

Vietnam
Olympic
Vietnam at the Olympics
1976 establishments in Vietnam
Sports organizations established in 1976